Orikum Marina is the only operational marina in Albania, located 1.5 km north of the small town of Orikum in the bay of Vlorë, Southern Albania. The marina, which is Italian-owned and managed, offers around 70 berths for yachts up to 15 metres in depths of up to 2.5 metres. There are plans to expand the number of berths to 100. Shelter in the marina is excellent from all wind directions.

References

External links
Official website

Ports and harbours of Albania